Mahonia gracilis is a plant species native to the Mexico, widely distributed from Tamaulipas to Oaxaca.

Mahonia gracilis is a shrub. Leaves are pinnately compound with 4-7 pairs of leaflets plus a larger terminal leaflet, all lanceolate with teeth along the margins. Flowers are yellow 6-parted flowers, borne in an elongated raceme. Fruits are dark blue and egg-shaped.

References

External links
photo of herbarium specimen at Missouri Botanical Garden, Mahonia gracilis collected in Nuevo León, México

gracilis
Endemic flora of Mexico
Flora of Central Mexico
Flora of Northeastern Mexico
Flora of Southwestern Mexico
Plants described in 1840
Cloud forest flora of Mexico
Flora of the Sierra Madre Oriental